A list of manga published by Shogakukan, listed by release date. For an alphabetical list, see :Category:Shogakukan manga.

1950s

1953
UTOPIA Saigo no Sekai Taisen

1959
Dr. Thrill
Dynamic 3
Kaikyuu x Arawaru!!
The Lone Ranger
Maboroshi Taisho
Ryuichi Yoru Banashi
Tonkatsu-chan
Uchuu Shōnen Tonda
Umi no Ouji
Zero Man

1960s

1960
Boku wa Jonbe he
Captain Ken
Denko Red
Kakedaze Dash
Kon-chan
Pink-chan
Seibangou 0 Monogatari
Shippo Eitaro
Yarikuri Tengoku

1961
Bun Bun
Iga no Kagemaru
Kon-chan Torimonocho
Konchaasu Bon Taro
Seton's Wild Animals
Shiroi Pilot
Shonen Kenia
Uchuu Keibitai

1962
Big 1
Brave Dan
Chibikko Chocho
Kakero Tenba
Osomatsu-kun
Ozora no Chikai
Tonga Series

1963
Akuma no Oto
Bakansu Kozo
Chōjintachi
Ganbare Kenta
Holiday Run
Katame Saru
Kaze no Jirokichi
Kurayami Godan
Maboroshi Buntai
Midori no Mujinto
Robot-kun
Sanpei Gekijō
Submarine 707
Yōki na Nakama
Yumei ga Ippai Vacation

1964
007 Series
Funky Boys
Hoero! Racer
Inazuma Ace
Kogarashi Ippei
Kotetsu Ningen Shiguma
Kyuban Dasha
Little Ghost Q-Taro
Niji no Sentotai
Pocket Rikishi
Sebangō 0
Yami no Sakon

1965
1 no 1 no 1
The Amazing 3
Attack Kobushi
Berabo
Captain Goro
Ijiwaru Kyōju
Kamui Gaiden
Korya My Futoshi
Kōryō
Miracle A
MM Santa
Ore no Taiyo
Ore wa Yaruzo
Super Jetter

1966
Abare Osho
Akakage
Akanbe Akanbo
Boken Gaboten Shima
Genjin Bibi
Kaimushi Kabuton
Oba-Q no Otoboke Gihyō
Ryu no Hata
Sabu to Ichi Torimono Hikae
Shinigami Hakase
Star 9
Thriller Kyōju
Thunder Kid
The Vampires

1967
Akatasuki Sentai
Animal One
Blue Submarine No. 6
Captain Scarlet
Captain Ultra
Chōsen Yarō
Danganko
Dororo
Genma Wars
Giant Robo
Gum Gum Punch
Guriguri
Hi no Maru Jindai
Jikogu-kun
Kamui Den
Mizuki Shigeru Yōkai Gekijō
Mōretsu Atarō
Mou Retsu Atarou
Oraa Guzura Dato
Perman
Shirato Sanpei Gekijō
Tama no Uta
Z to Yobareru Otoko

1968
21 Emon
Ah!! Koshien
Blue Zone
Chikyu Number V7
Doctor Tsururi
Dokachin
Golgo 13
Inakappe Taishō 
Judo Boy
Kappa no Sanpei
The Laughing Salesman 
Matt Helm
MJ
Moero Nio
Phoenix Jyo
Sasuke
Swallowing the Earth
Tenamonya Ipponyari
Unabara no Ken
Utae!! Mustang
Zubeko Tantei Ran

1969
Chikai no Hata
Devil King
Doronko Kyujo
Gen to Tsugumi
Gunman / Fukushū no Mugonka
Hitokui Tetsudo
Kage Gari
Karasu
Kudabare!! Namida-kun
Orochi: Blood
Princess Knight
Target
Tensai Bakabon
Ume-boshi no Denka
Uragiri no Gunpoint
Yami no Kaze

1970s

1970
Again
Bukkare Dan
CM Yarou
Dekkadeka
Dame Oyaji
Doraemon
Go!! Go!! Nonsense
Group Gin
Keiji Yoshitani
Maro
Ode to Kirihito 
Otoko do Aho Koshien
Red Colored Elegy
The Shikippuru
Tobenai Tsubasa
Wandering Sun
Yoake no Makki
Zeni Geba

1971
Abare Fubuki
Challenge D
Cyborg Ace
The Foghorn Sounded
Glass no No
GeGeGe no Kitarō
Hadashi no Bun
Hato to Sakura
Kaijin Jaguar Man
Kenka no Bible
Kokuhaku
Rekka
Rettsuragon
The Return of Ultraman
Ruthless Trap
Seishun Dobaku
Senbe
Sokkyūya
Subahen
Tabidate! Hirarin
Tamagawa-kun

1972
Akado Suzunosuke
Android Kikaider
Arajin no Musuko
Ayako 
The Drifting Classroom
Dust 18
Fuefuki Doji
Fuma Kotaro
Hiyoshi no Shiro
Jinzō-Ningen Kikaider
Joker e...
Judo Sanka
Kantaro Monogatari
Kedaman
Kibahashiri
Koma ga Mau
The Moon
Nagareboshi Sub
Oi! Boketan
The Poe Clan
Tatsu ga Kiru!
Thunder Mask

1973
Abu-san
Catch Man
Dororon Enma-kun
Diamond Eye
Fresh Blood of the Final Round
Haguregumo 
Inazuman
Jinjin no Jin
Kuroi Washi
Notari Matsutarō 
Okkaa Yakuza
Ore wa Chokkaku
The Song of Tentomushi
Ultraman Taro

1974
Dream Slugger
First Human Giatrus
Ganbare Robokon
Getter Robo
The Heart of Thomas
Little Boy
Musashi
Oira Sukeban
Otoko Gumi
Pro Golfer Saru
Shonen Friday
Sunset on Third Street

1975
Ace of Hearts
A Blow for That Girl!
Goemon Rokku
Himitsu Sentai Gorenger
Ikkyu-san
Kamen Godamaru
Kibasen
Nora Gaki
Shin Himitsu Sentai Gorenja Gokko
Tenkaiichi Omonoten
They Were Eleven

1976
Boku Chan Sensei
Cat Eyed Boy
Doggu World
Gamushara
Ganbare Genki
Ginrin Jaguar
God Arm
The Harsh Story of a Manga Artist
Kaa-chan No. 1
Kaze to Ki no Uta
Makoto-chan
Megido no Hi
MW
Panku Ponk
Soggy Papa
Survival
Zoku Jūichinin Iru! Higashi no Chihei, Nishi no Towa

1977
Akai Pegasus
Dekin Boy
Eiyu Shikkaku
Esper Mami
Galaxy Express 999
Ginrin Tama
Gyag Ariki
Katsumi
Kiteretsu Daihyakka
Seishun no Kawa
Tobetobe Tonbi
Tsukiya
Whimsical Punch

1978
Asari-chan
California Story
Hit and Run
Game Center Arashi
Ken
Majokko Tickle
Nijitte Monogatari
Nine
Pair of Aces
Phantom Burai
Ryokudo-kun
Seishun Dobutsuen Zoo
Space Opera Chugaku
Teens
Urusei Yatsura
Wind in the Green Leaves
A Word from the Freeloader
Yakyu Mushi
The Youthful Path

1979
Abare Taikai
Akkan Man
Area 88
Bangai Koshien
Basubon Tokkyu
Cyborg 009
Dash Kappei
Doro Fighter
Funsen Yodels
Futari no Shogun
Goronbomatsu
Hotto Keddogu
Tsuribaka Nisshi
Wanten Tantei

1980s

1980
Doraemon Long Stories
Hiatari Ryōkō!
Hockey Wolf
I Love Ayume
Katte ni Yorimichi
Pro Wrestling Superstar Retsuden
Maison Ikkoku
Maris the Chojo
Miyuki
The Monster Kid
Otoko Oozora
Sasuga no Sarutobi
Seishun Knuckle 4
Super Rider
Tadaima Jugyouchuu!
Uridase! Panpusu
The Visitor

1981
Chance
Damekko Yuki-chan
Dokkiri Doctor
Family!
Futari Daka
Hashire! Haruma
Hatsukoi Scandal
Hidamari no Ki 
Human Crossing
Justy
Musashi no Ken
Neri Wasabi Kyoso Kyoku
Ninja Hattori-kun
Sayonara Sankaku
Ten Made Agare
Tokukyu GO!
Touch
Wounded Man
Yuta Yunaika

1982
Dart Tokyu
Georgie!
Gu Gu Ganmo
Hashire Kakeru
Hi no Tama Boy
The Legend of Kamui
Kaze no Senshi Dan
Kochantorei
Love Z
Nanka Ayakai!?
Ore wa Namazumono
Pinto Pittashi!
Saraba Jinrui
Torai Torai

1983
Alpen Rose
Blazing Transfer Student
Fire Tripper
Green Grass
Harumi 120%
Iron Virgin Jun 
Kisshō Tennyo
Laughing Target
Night
Oishinbo 
Prefectural Earth Defense Force
Seiunji
Sono Ki ni Natte Mo
Sono Na mo Agaro
Takeru
Yoki no Kamome

1984
A, A Prime
Ao Kobushi Okami
Blizzard Princess
Datsusen Gennen
Eichi Man
Fancy Dance
Fighting Sweeper
Harukana Bishi
Just Meet
Megunchi Monogatari
Mermaid Saga
No. 1 Linna
Pro Wrestling Taishofu
Purple Eyes in the Dark
Ragnarok Guy
Shirobe
Sprinter
Striker Retsuden
Unico
ZINGY

1985
Aosora Floppy
Balancer
B.B.
Banana Fish
Birdy the Mighty
Boyfriend
Chimpui
Chotto Yoroshiku
F 
Ganbare, Kickers!
Hound Eleven
Kyūkyoku Chōjin R
Pineapple Army 
Magical Emi, the Magic Star
Mai, the Psychic Girl
Marginal
Night Bird
Rikugun Nakano Yobiko
Short Program
Suteki ni Yabanjin
Tenchi Muyo/This Side Up
Tsurupika Hagemaru
To-y

1986
Aji Ichi Monme
Caravan Kidd
Crying Freeman 
Doki Doki Heartbeat
Famicom Runner: Takahashi Meijin Monogatari
Happi Chokuzen
Kaze wo Nuke!
Maboroshi Umaboroshi
O~i! Ryōma
Panic Hoteishiki
Pastel Yumi, the Magic Idol
Ryū
Slow Step
Tosho Boy
Xenon
Yagami-kun no Katei no Jijō
Yawara!

1987
Aozora Shot
Ayame ni Oteage!
Bokura wa v3
Bucchigiri
Chichi Monogatari
Dash! Yonkuro
GOAL
Gringo 
I'm Namu
Joshi Chugakusei Note
Kamen Rider Black
Kogen Mura he Yokoso
Koshien ga Suki!
Kotton Tetsumaru
Kuruman BOY
Magic Kaito
Momoka Typhoon
One-pound Gospel
Ranma ½
Rough
Smile for Mii
Sports Tenko Mari
Suiyo Bokenasu Shiteseki
Totsugeki Wolf

1988
Akai Pegasus II Sho
Angel
Bakkure Ippei
Bear Mader Ryusuke
Bimi Paradise
Dokachin Kid
Genji Monogatari
Hikari Ikanga Gakuen
Kenji
Kenta Yarimasu!
Kyō Kara Ore Wa!!
Makoto-chan
Master Keaton 
Matador
My Pace Futaro
Mobile Police Patlabor
Seventeen Cop
Shin Kiteretsu Daihyakka
Tearful Soldier
Tokyo Love Story 
Ucchare Goshogawara
Wind Up!!
Yaiba

1989
Ano Ko ni 1000%
DaDa!
Dance till Tomorrow 
Dinosaur Carnival
Dr. Shiina no Kyoikuteki Shido!!
Free Kick!
Geo-Police Joe
Heavy
Hoshikuzu Paradise
Kenta Yarimasu!
Kojiro
MAD STONE
Heisei-ban Makoto-chan
Mash
Ninkimono de Iko
Obi wo gyutto ne!
Otokichi-kun no Piano Monogatari
Seishun Tiebreak!
Shōnen
Spriggan
Terrible Shōnen-dan
Tuck In
Utsurun Desu.

1990s

1990
Amaku Kiken na Nampa Deka
Baron
Basara
Chiku Chiku Uni Uni
Even a Monkey Can Draw Manga 
Getter Robo Go
Heavy Metal Koshien
Junk Party
Kaze no Daichi
Living Game 
Makoto Call!
Niji-iro Tohgarashi
Okami-san 
RATS
Sanctuary
Shishunki Miman Okotowari
Super Mario-Kun
Tasuke, the Samurai Cop
Tatoeba Konna Love Song
Tough
Unoken no Bakuhatsu Ugyaa!!
Ushio and Tora
Waltz in a White Dress
Wangan Midnight
Welcome
Yugengaisha Shinahyakkaten

1991
Ao no Fūin
Benkei in New York 
The Doraemons
Fullmetal Boxer
Ghost Sweeper Mikami
Go!! Southern Ice Hockey Club
Hono no Ninjaman
Kyō Kara Ore Wa!!
Lucky Guy
Makasete Eruna
Mizuiro Jidai
Ore wa Otoko Da! Kunio-kun
PATI-PATI
Rappa S.S.
Samurai Crusader
Sengoku Koshien: Kyū inu-shi densetsu
Twinkle Twinkle Idol Star
Very Good Manten!!
Yoban Sādo

1992
Asunaro Hakusho 
Bara no Tame ni
Bokkō
Bow Wow
Chōryū Senki Sauros Knight
Doki Doki! Enma-kun
Fu·ta·ri
Fushigi Yûgi
Gallery Fake 
Geki Saru Theater
H2
Hiten Boso Densho MAOH
Iguana Girl
Jesus
Jinbē
Jodan Jyanai yo!
Kaitei Jinrui Anchovy
Kakutou Oumonogo Byun Boy
Kotei Senshi Hankyu
Lilac Nocturne
Ogre Slayer
Ojisan Boy!! Shogaku Chugakusei
Oretachi no Field
Ossu! Shorenji
PC Genjin-kun
Reverser: Jikū no Ryūkihei
Sonic the Hedgehog
Super Dimensional Fortress Macross II: Lovers Again
Super Mario Adventures
Tokio
Tokon Shojo
Tokyo Daigaku Monogatari
Zoku Shishunki Miman Okotowari

1993
Byakuren no Fang
B•F Fish Boys
Blue Spring
A Cruel God Reigns
Gakuen Teikoku Ore wa Jubei!
Geki Tori Theater
Happy!
Itadakimasu!
LOVe
Mama wa Shōgaku 4 Nensei
Muka Muka Paradise
Osaruna Masaru-kun
Tekkonkinkreet
Uwasa no Otokomae

1994
Arigatō 
Atashi ni Tsuiterasshai
Azumi
Bakusō Kyōdai Let's & Go!!
Ganba! Fly High
Detective Conan
Drum Knuckle -Final Fight-
Geki Inu Theater
Jaja Uma Grooming Up!
Magnolia Waltz
Major
Masurao Hiongiseiki
Monster
Mugen Zero
Oretachi ni Asu wa Naissu]
Oyani wa Naisho
R·PRINCESS
Samurai Shodown
Shout!
Super Street Fighter II Cammy
Tokyo Boys & Girls
Tonde Burin
Wedding Peach

1995
Aho Aho Gakuen
Burst Ball Barrage!! Super B-Daman
Dan Doh!!
Dolphin Brain
Enya KODOMO Ninpocho
Firefighter! Daigo of Fire Company M
Flame of Recca
Go-Go Ecchan no Caster Mairuzo!
Kanon
Kocchi Muite! Miiko
Koimonogatari
Mint de Kiss Me
Mojacko
Red River
Sabaku no Yakyubu
Sakura Diaries
Sodatte Darling!!
Tokyo Bancho
Wedding Peach Ai Tenshi Tanjou hen

1996
Accidents
Angel Lip
Ceres, Celestial Legend
Four Shōjo Stories
Hikenden Kira
InuYasha
Meibutsu!! Utsukemono Honpo
Monkey Turn
Nagisa Me Kounin
Over Rev!
Ping Pong
Pocket Monsters
Revolutionary Girl Utena
Shinsei Motemote Oukoku
Strain
Taiyo no Senshi Boka Boka
Tennen Senshi G
Tokyo Juliet
Warp Boy
Yasha

1997
B.B. Explosion
Bomberman B-Daman Bakugaiden
Cutie Honey Flash
Devil & Devil
Dolphin Brain
Eagle: The Making of an Asian-American President 
Fancy Zatsuwazadan
Forbidden Dance
Gain
Hamtaro
Karakuri Circus
Kaze Hikaru
Mach GoGoGo!
Magical Pokémon Journey
Mo Sungoi!!
Over Rev!
Pokémon Adventures
Pokémon: The Electric Tale of Pikachu
Project ARMS
Sensual Phrase
Super Yo-Yo
Tuxedo Gin
Ushio and Tora Gaiden
Windmill

1998
A Distant Neighborhood
Appare Jipangu! 
Bōken Shōnen 
Bomberman B-Daman Bakugaiden V
Crash Bandicoot—Dansu! de Jump! na Daibōken
Ichi the Killer
Katte ni Kaizō
The Legend of Zelda: Ocarina of Time
Salad Days
Shishunki Miman Okotowari Kanketsuhen
Spin Out
Taro the Space Alien
TEN MAN
Umizaru
Uzumaki 
Whistle!
Wild Act
The Wind of Fight
Yoiko

1999
20th Century Boys
Ask Dr. Rin!
Ayumu no Koma
Believers
Beyblade
Binetsu Shōjo
Cheeky Angel
Chocolat 
Corrector Yui
Dainamu Itou!
Duel Masters
Fantasista
Grizzly Bear Story
Heat
Kamoshika!
Men Soul!!!
New Town Heroes
Passport Blue
Pukupuku Natural Circular Notice
Southern Cross
Tatakae! Ryōzanpaku Shijō Saikyō
Tokyo Keiji

2000s

2000
Brave Saru s
Chicago
Chō Ikusei Shinwa Pagunasu
Dobutsu no Kame-chan
Dan Doh!! Xi
Dorabase
Dorohedoro
Doubt!!
Dr. Kotō Shinryōjo
G Senjō Heaven's Door
GoGo Monster
Heisei Tokimeki Rikishi Punyarin
Hot Gimmick
Imadoki!
Itsumo Misora
The Legend of Zelda: Majora's Mask
Libero Revolution
Marvelous
Mister Japan
Moonlight Mile
Neo Gomanism Manifesto Special – On Taiwan
No. 5
Omunehari
Saikano
Sexy Voice and Robo
Shin Aji Ichi Monme
Sukimasuki
Takeru Michi
Togari
Tsukiji Uogashi Sandaime

2001
7 Seeds
Akuma na Eros
Alice 19th
Amakusa 1637
Blade of the Phantom Master
Bullet
Croket!
Do! Rill!!
Grandpa Danger
Gyo 
HEAT WAVE
HORIZON
Iruka!!
Kakene nashi no LOVE torihiki
Katsu!
Konjiki no Gash!!
The Law of Ueki
MegaMan NT Warrior
Mirmo de Pon!
Night Lovers
Pangea no Musume Kunie
Panyo Panyo Di Gi Charat
RahXephon
Rising Sun
Shigeshida ☆ Shokun!
Zatch Bell!

2002
365 no Yuki
Battle B-Daman
Black Lagoon
Bomberman Jetters
BREAKTHROUGH! ~Niji no Petal~
Chain of Pearls
D-Live!!
Densetsu no Stafy
Fall in Love Like a Comic!
Fight no Akatsuki
Fighting Beauty Wulong
First Girl
Forza! Hidemaru
Girls Saurus
Haou Airen
Idejuu!
Ichiban-yu Kanata
Kare First Love
Kenichi: The Mightiest Disciple
Kiichi!!
Kimi no Kakera
Kōkō Afro Tanaka
Let's Go!! Bomberman Jetters
Midori Days
Otherworld Barbara
Otori Bomber
Perfect Partner
Pet
Rainbow: Nisha Rokubō no Shichinin
Rec
Saikyō Densetsu Kurosawa 
Senpuu no Tachibana
Sonnanja neyo
Team Medical Dragon
We Were There
Yakitate!! Japan

2003
A Spirit of the Sun
Absolute Boyfriend
Beauty Pop
Bokurano: Ours
Danchi Tomoo 
Dash & Spin: Super Fast Sonic
Dawn of the Arcana
Denjin 1 Gō
Homunculus 
Girls Saurus DX
Kekkaishi
Kowashiya Gamon
Kuromatsu - The Nobelest
Kurosagi
Kurozakuro
MÄR
Freesia
Fushigi Yûgi Genbu Kaiden
Gaku: Minna no Yama 
Love & SexSHO-COMI Pink Label
Ore-sama wa?
PEACE MAKER
Pluto
Pocket Monsters Ruby-Sapphire
Rakugaki Fighter ~Hero of Saint Paint~
Ren'aishijōshugi
Rideback
Robot Boys
Rockman Zero
Sand Chronicles
Tokyo Eitīzu
Shonen Thunder
Toritsu Mizusho!
Uttare Daikichi!
Wild Life
What a Wonderful World!
Zetsubō ni Kiku Kusuri
Zoku Manga Mitaina Koi Shitai!

2004
AM Driver
Backstage Prince
Bambino! 
Bengoshi no Kuzu 
Binbō Shimai Monogatari
Chūtai Afro Tanaka
Codename Babyface
The Cornered Mouse Dreams of Cheese
Dan Doh! Next Generation
Doshiro de Gozaru
Eve no Nemuri
Happy Hustle High
Hayate the Combat Butler
Honey × Honey Drops
Kaikisenban! Juugorou
Kamikaze Girls
Keshikasu-kun
Kingyo Used Books
Kirarin Revolution
Kowashiyagamon
Kurozakuro
Last Inning
Love Celeb
Monkey High!
Pocket Monsters Emerald: Challenge! Battle Frontier
Pokémon Colosseum: Snatcher Leo
Ratchet & Clank: Bang Bang Bang! Critical Danger of the Galaxy Legend
Romance of Darkness
Shin Nijitte Monogatari
Shishunki Keiji Minoru Kobayashi
Socrates in Love
Toyuki
Ushijima the Loan Shark
Wedding Peach Young Love

2005
Ai Kora
Ani-Funjatta!
Ayakashido Horai
Blizzard Axel
Cross Game
Doraemon+
Duel Masters: Fighting Edge
Fluffy, Fluffy Cinnamoroll
Hakuba no Ōji-sama 
Happy Happy Clover
House of Five Leaves
Idol Ace
Ikigami: The Ultimate Limit
Kobato
The Law of Ueki Plus
Lord
Miagete Goran
Mogura no Uta
Naisho no Tsubomi
Neko Navi
Pokémon Mystery Dungeon: Ginji's Rescue Team
Psychic Squad
Saikyō! Toritsu Aoizaka Kōkō Yakyūbu
Solanin
Train Man: Densha Otoko
Twin Princess of Wonder Planet
Zettai Karen Children
A Zoo in Winter

2006
A Penguin's Troubles
Ai Ore!
BakéGyamon
Beast Master
Black Bird
Bushin
Butterflies, Flowers
Chitei Shonen Chappy
Cirque du Freak
Children of the Sea
Crash B-Daman
Densetsu no Stafy R
Fist of the North Star
Geki ai motto motometai
Gokujō!! Mecha Mote Iinchō
Golden★Age
Grandliner
Harunokuni
Heaven's Will
Hijiri Kessho Albatross
Honey Hunt
Hoshi no Furumachi
Jormungand
Jibo no Hoshi
Kamisama Dolls
The Legend of Zelda: The Minish Cap
MÄR Omega
Midnight Secretary
Pocket Monsters DP
RANGEMAN
Shin'ya Shokudō
Shiikuhime
Shirokuma Cafe
Takemitsuzamurai
Tasukete! Flower Man
Umimachi Diary

2007
21st Century Boys
Aoi Honō
Dengeki Daisy
Dennō Coil: The Comics
Dive!!
Gamble!
Goodnight Punpun
Happy Kappy
Hitohira no Koi ga Furu
Ifrit: Danzai no Enjin
I'll Give It My All... Tomorrow
Jōkyō Afro Tanaka
Joō no Hana
Kamurobamura-e
Kids on the Slope
Kiichi VS
Kongō Banchō
Kunai Den
Kyō, Koi o Hajimemasu
Machi de Uwasa no Tengu no Ko
Maoh: Juvenile Remix
Mari to Koinu no Monogatari
Marine Hunter
Meteorite Breed
Mysterious Joker
Obou Samba
Ochanigosu.
Rhapsody in Heaven
Sakura Gari
Tomehane! Suzuri Kōkō Shodōbu

2008
Aji Ichi Monme - Dokuritsu Hen
Arata: The Legend
Artist Acro
Beyblade: Metal Fusion
Channel wa sono mama!
Chibi Devi!
Duel Masters: Star Cross
Hyde & Closer
Inazuma Eleven
Joō no Hana 
King Golf
Lost+Brain
Mitsuboshi no Speciality
Mixim 11
Moonlight Act
Onidere
Piece
Pokémon Diamond and Pearl Adventure!
Saijō no Meii
Shin Kurosagi 
Shitsuren Chocolatier
Shut Hell
Suki Desu Suzuki-kun!!
Traumeister
The World God Only Knows

2009
Afterschool Charisma
Akira
Asagiro
Azumanga Daioh: Supplementary Lessons
Bambino! Second
Birthday
Chōdokyū Shōjo 4946
D no Maō
Daisan Sekai no Nagai
Dawn of the Arcana
Defense Devil
Denno Yuki Club
Gakushin Ou - Vero Musica
Happy Marriage!?
Hajimete no Aku
Hallelujah Overdrive!
Hime Gal Paradise
I Am a Hero 
Itsuka Omae to Jiruba o
Itsuwaribito
Jewelpet
Jio to Ôgon to Kinjirareta Mahô
Kanojo wa Uso o Aishisugiteru
Kenryoku no Inu Police Wan!
Kieyuku Shōjo
Kōkō Kyūji Zawa-san
Kokoro Button
Kyō no Asuka Show
The Legend of Zelda: Phantom Hourglass
Let's Play with Yvonne
Lilpri
Lindbergh
Magi: The Labyrinth of Magic
Mahō Gyōshōnin Roma
Mahō no Iroha!
Makoto no Ōja
Manekoi
Mirai no Football
Mushibugyo
Nobunaga Concerto
Nozoki Ana
Number One Kaidoh
Otoko no Isshō
Otome Genocide
Pin to Kona
Ping Pong Rush
Q and A
Rin-ne
Samurai High School
Seishinshi
Shōgaku ni Nyansei
Sprite
Super-Dreadnought Girl 4946
Takanashi-san
Takkoku!!!
The!! Beach Stars
Together Sugarbunnies
Tomorrows
Tsuuru!
Undead
Welcome to the El-Palacio
Yaoyoroo!
Yoshitō-sama

2010s

2010
Alice in Borderland
Ane no Kekkon
Arago ~London Shikei Tokushu Hanzai Sōsakan~
Baku Tech! Bakugan
Bengoshi no Kuzu Dainishin 
Chiisaihito Aoba Jidou Soudansho Monogatari
Dangerous Jii-san Ja
A Drunken Dream and Other Stories
Duel Hero: Dash
Duel Masters: Legendary Champion
Flower and the Beast
Futagashira
GOGO♪ Tamagotchi!
Hanamote Katare
Hideout
Kaitai Shinsho 0
Koutetsu no Hanappashira
Kunisaki Izumo no Jijō
Misaki, Number 1!!
Neko kare kūru Sho-comi men' s collection
Niji-iro Prism Girl
Pocket Monsters HGSS
Saijo no Meii ~The King of Neet~
Saijo wa? Straight!!
Sasurai Afro Tanaka
Sengoku Yatagarasu
Shut Hell
Sunny
Taberu Dake
T.R.A.P.
Washi ga Shishou Zeyo!

2011
Anagle Mole
Asahinagu
Asaoka High School Baseball Club Diary: Over Fence
B-Daman Crossfire
Be Blues! - Ao ni Nare
BUYUDEN
Danball Senki Kaidō Jin Gaiden
Dōse Mō Nigerarenai
Duel Masters Victory
Futagashira
GAN☆KON
Inazuma Eleven GO
Inubu! -Bokura no Shippo Senki
Jinrui wa Suitai Shimashita: Nonbirishita Hōkoku
Jōjū Senjin!! Mushibugyō
Little Battlers Experience
Majestic Prince
Nijitte Monogatari
Nozomi to Mikio
Osumojii! Tsukasa no Ikkan
Pocket Monsters BW
Pocket Monsters RéBURST
Pretty Rhythm: Aurora Dream
Puriri! Lilpri
Runway wo ? Produce!!
Shichigatsu no Hone
Silver Spoon
Soul Lord 2
Ultimate Otaku Teacher
Ultraman

2012
Age 12
AKB48 Satsujin jiken
Ane log - Aiko Neesan no Tomaranai Monologue
Area D Inou Ryouiki
Aura: Koga Maryuin's Last War
B-Daman Fireblast
Beyblade: Shogun Steel
Duel Masters Revolution
Fantasista Stella
Hachimitsu ni Hatsukoi
Hime Hajike
Jinrui wa Suitai Shimashita: Nonbirishita Hōkoku 4-koma
Jinrui wa Suitai Shimashita: Yōsei, Shimasu ka?
Jūhan Shuttai!
Kengan Ashura
Koakumaouden Senkore!
Kujaku Ō Rising
Kyōgaku Kōkou no Genjitsu
Levius
Master Keaton Remaster 
Miseinen Dakedo Kodomo Janai
Mix
Mob Psycho 100
Mobile Suit Gundam Thunderbolt
My Youth Romantic Comedy Is Wrong, As I Expected @ comic
Nadeshiko no Kiseki Kawasumi Nahomi Monogatari
Pretty Rhythm: Dear My Future
Sasami-san@Ganbaranai
Shiki no Zenjitsu
Shin Dorabase
Shin Kurosagi Kanketsu-hen
Shūmatsu no Laughter
So Cute it Hurts!!
Sword Gai
Tadashii Kodomo no Tsukurikata!
Yo-kai Watch
Yume no Shizuku, Kin no Torikago

2013
37.5°C no Namida
After School Dice Club
Aikatsu! Official Fanbook
Anoko no Toriko
Birdmen
Character Times
Chōsuinō kei
Danball Senki Wars
Disu × Komi
Future Card Buddyfight
GOGO Tamagotchi! Dream
Hyōkyūhime×Tokiwagi Kantoku no Kajō na Aijō
Infinite Stratos
Keijo!!!!!!!!
Killing Bites
Koi, pinku. Watashi no kimochi, kiite kureru?
Kokushi Musō!
Levius
Magi: Adventure of Sinbad
Magical Star Kanon 100%
My Little Pony: Friendship Is Magic (produced by Akira Himekawa, not related to IDW comic series)
Nobelu
Penguin no Mondai +
Pretty Rhythm: Rainbow Live
Sayonara Sorcier
Shin Kurosawa: Saikyō Densetsu 
Teasing Master Takagi-san
True Love
The Unlimited: Hyōbu Kyōsuke
Yo-kai Watch: Exciting Nyanderful Days
Yugami-kun ni wa tomodachi ga inai

2014
4-Panel Yo-kai Watch: Geragera Manga Theater
1518!
After the Rain
Aikatsu!: Next Phase
Aikatsu!: Secret Story
Ashita wa Doyōbi
Atom: The Beginning
A-un
Bakusō Kyōdai Let's & Go!! Return Racers!!
Bōkyaku no Sachiko
Captain Earth
Chi no Kyokuchi - Daiya no King-hen
Chrono Monochrome
Dagashi Kashi
Dead Dead Demon's Dededede Destruction 
Devilman Saga
Dezicon
Eiga to Tenshi
Ginkai no Speed Star
Ginpaku no Paladin - Seikishi
Guardians of the Louvre 
Heavens Runner Akira
Helck
Hengoku no Schwester
Hibiki: Shōsetsuka ni Naru Hōhō
Hikari-Man
The Idolmaster Million Live!
Imawa no Kuni no Alice - Daiya no King
Imawa no Kuni no Alice - Spade no King
It's My Life
Jinsei
Joker Game
Kamen Rider Kuuga
Kami nomi zo Shiru Sekai: On the Train
Kedamame
Kenkō de Bunkateki na Saitei Gendo no Seikatsu
Kiriwo Terrible
Lady Jewelpet
The Legendary Hero Is Dead!
Nani mo Nai Kedo Sora wa Aoi
Nozo x Kimi - 2-nen-sei-hen
Oishii Kamishama
Oyasumi Karasu, Mata Kite ne
Para Para Days
The Pilot's Love Song
Pocket Monsters XY
Pretty Rhythm: All Star Selection
Princess Maison
PriPara
Psyche Matashitemo
QQ Sweeper
Santiago: Rebellion Shimabara
Sensou Gejikou
Shinkon ♥ gentei mesukōseidakedo, kekkon shimasu
Tasogare Memorandum
Tokusatsu Gagaga

2015
100% Pascal-sensei
Ad Astra per Aspera
Ageku no Hate no Kanon
Aikatsu!: Go! Go! Go!
Alice on Border Road
Akatsuki no bōkun
Amano Megumi wa Sukidarake!
And-Pair
Aoashi
Battle Game in 5 Seconds
Burning Kabaddi
The Case of Hana & Alice
Coffee & Vanilla
Dance Dance Danseur
Furo Girl!
Fushigi Yûgi Byakko Ibun
Ginrō Blood Bone
Hatsukoi Zombie
Hyper Dash! Yonkuro
Infini-T Force
Komasan 〜A Time for Fireworks and Miracles〜
Kotaro Lives Alone
Licca-chan
Love Is Like a Cocktail
Major 2nd
Million Yen Women
Nanoha Yougashiten no Ii Shigoto
Nippen!
Osake wa Fūfu ni Natte kara
Our Dreams at Dusk
PriPri Chi-chan!!
Queen's Quality
Rion-san, Meiwakadesu
Ritasu 2-kobun no suteki
Saezuri high school OK-bu!
Shiawase Afro Tanaka
Takunomi.
Tenshi to Akuto!!
Tokiwa Kitareri!!
Tokyo Alien Bros.
Tutti!
The Unlimited: Hyōbu Kyōsuke - WANDERER
The Water Dragon's Bride
Yo-kai Watch Busters
Yo-kai Watch: 4-Panel Pun-Club

2016
Aji Ichi Monme - Sekai no naka no washoku Hen
Aikatsu Stars!
Amano Megumi wa Sukidarake!
Aozakura: Bouei Daigakukou Monogatari
B-PROJECT Mousou＊Scandal
Beyblade Burst
Beyblade Rising
Eisen Flügel
Fureru to Kikoeru
Hen na Mono Mikke!
Hiiragi-sama wa Jibun wo Sagashiteiru
How Heavy Are the Dumbbells You Lift?
Imōto Sae Ireba Ii. @comic
Jinmen
Keep Your Hands Off Eizouken!
Komi Can't Communicate
Maiko-san chi no Makanai-san
Mayoiga ~Tsumi to Batsu~
Moshi Moshi, Terumi Desu
My Solo Exchange Diary
Oni wo Tadorite Ikuseisou
Otokonoko Zuma
Persona 5
RYOKO
Sandē hi Kagakukenkyūjo
Sanrio Boys
Seton Academy: Join the Pack!
Sleepy Princess in the Demon Castle
Sōbōtei Kowasubeshi
Sōkyū Boys
Versailles of the Dead
The Violence Action
Whistle! W
Y no Hakobune

2017
Akagari: The Red Rat in Hollywood
Ao no Orchestra
Ariadne in the Blue Sky
Asoko de Hataraku Musubu-san
Babel
Blood on the Tracks
Daiku no Hatō
Don't Call it Mystery
Downfall
The Duke of Death and His Maid
Fushigi Yûgi Byakko Senki
Future Card Buddyfight Ace
Fuuto PI
Gaishū Isshoku!
Gallery Fake
Gigant
Hada Camera
Hana ni Arashi
Hoankan Evans no Uso
Jagaaan
Karakai Jōzu no (Moto) Takagi-san
Kimajime-hime to Bunbōgu-ōji
Koi ni Koisuru Yukari-chan
Kusuriya no Hitorigoto: Maomao no Koukyuu Nazotoki Techou
Let's & Go!! Tsubasa, the Next Racers
Marry Grave
Mujirushi: The Sign of Dreams
Nigatsu no Shōsha
Ningyohime no Gomen ne Gohan
No Longer Human
Pocket Monsters Sun and Moon
Re:Creators
Re:Creators One More!
Revolutionary Girl Utena: After the Revolution
Saitsuyo Densetsu Nakane
Shōwa Tennō Monogatari
Snack World
Tantei Xeno to Nanatsu no Satsujin Misshitsu
Tokachi Hitoribocchi Nōen
Yōkai Giga

2018
Aikatsu Friends!
Bakutsuri Bar Hunter
Batman Ninja
Chrono Ma:gia: Mugen no Haguruma
Chrono Ma:gia:Toki no Shōkansha to Shiraha no Hanayome
Coffee & Vanilla: Black
Detective Conan: Zero's Tea Time
Fly Me to the Moon
Gofun-go no Sekai
How Do We Relationship?
Idol × Warrior Miracle Tunes! Yume no Harmony
Kimi wa 008
Kiratto Pri Chan
Magic x Warrior Magimajo Pures!: Magical na Mainichi
Memesis
Promise Cinderella
REIGEN
Shinkurō, Hashiru!
switch
Yūsha Sagawa to Ano Futari-hen
Zoids Wild

2019
100 Nichi Go ni Shinu Wani
Aikatsu on Parade!
As the Demon King's Right Hand, I'm Going to Rewrite the Script!
Call of the Night
Dai Dark
Detective Conan: Police Academy Arc
Do You Like the Nerdy Nurse?
Don't XXX With Teachers!
FIRE RABBIT!!
Hanabi-chan Is Often Late
Imouto Rireki
Kaii to Otome to Kamikakushi
Kaminaki Sekai no Kamisama Katsudō
Kengan Omega
MAO
Mikazuki no Dragon
No Longer Allowed In Another World
Ponkotsu-chan Kenshōchū
The Tale of the Outcasts
Undine of the Desert World
Vampeerz
Yuko Sae Tatakaeba

2020s

2020
22/7 +α
Chi: On the Movements of the Earth
Frieren
Hei no Naka no Biyōshitsu
I'm Not Meat
Kanakana
Kekkon Surutte, Hontō desu ka
Kujō no Taizai
Ladies on Top
Minami Nanami Wants to Shine
My One-Hit Kill Sister
Phobia
Rooster Fighter
Ryū to Ichigo
Saigo no Yūransen
Trillion Game
The Tunnel to Summer, the Exit of Goodbye: Ultramarine

2021
Cat on the Hero's Lap
Hirayasumi
Kakeau Tsukihi
Sexiled
Shiroyama to Mita-san
Yashahime: Princess Half-Demon
Yasuke

2022

Unsorted
The Doraemons' Special: Robot School Memories
In the Bathroom
Jitsuroku Adachi Mitsuru Monogatari
Kimi no Tonari de Seishunchuu
Kikaider
SP: Security Police

See also
List of works published by Shogakukan
List of manga published by Shueisha
List of manga published by Hakusensha

References

Shogakukan
 
Shogakukan